Elina Duni (born 10 March 1981, Tirana, Albania) is a Swiss-Albanian jazz singer and composer. She left Albania at the age of ten to live and study in Geneva, Switzerland. She went on to study singing, composition and teaching at the University of the Arts Bern, but from 2004 onwards Albanian folk music became a prime influence. At this moment, in 2004, she formed a quartet under her own name with the Swiss jazz pianist Colin Vallon, bassist Patrice Moret and drummer Norbert Pfammatter. In a review, John Fordham concluded that "This quartet definitely sounds like rising star material for ECM." After two albums – Baresha (2008) and Lume Lume (2010) – on Meta Records, the quartet went on to record for ECM in 2012, with Matanë Malit (Beyond the Mountain) and in 2015, Dallëndyshe (Swallow). In 2014, she released her first album as a singer-songwriter in Kosovo and Albania, entitled Muza e Zezë (The Black Muse). In 2017, she was nominated to receive the annual Swiss Music Prize and in October of the same year she started a new project - a duo with the jazz guitarist Rob Luft. The album Partir, a solo programme in which she accompanies herself on piano, acoustic guitar and percussion was recorded in 2017 and released by ECM the following year. She sings in nine different languages on that solo studio album.

Being musically a duo and also privately a couple, Duni now lives with Rob Luft in London, after many years in Zurich before. The 2020 album Lost Ships comprehends six Duni/Luft originals and six interpretations. Sidemen are Matthieu Michel on flugelhorn and multi-instrumentalist Fred Thomas on piano and percussion.

Discography
 2007 - Baresha
 2010 - Lume, Lume
 2012 - Matanë Malit
 2014 - Muza e zezë (English: The Black Muse)
 2015 - Dallëndyshe
 2018 - Partir
 2019 - Aksham
 2020 - Lost Ships (with Rob Luft)

References

External links
 Elina Duni

Albanian emigrants to Switzerland
21st-century Albanian women singers
1981 births
Living people
Musicians from Tirana
21st-century Swiss musicians
21st-century women musicians
21st-century Swiss women singers
ECM Records artists